Sophie Chang and Angela Kulikov defeated Miyu Kato and Aldila Sutjiadi in the final, 6–3, 4–6, [10–6] to win the women's doubles tennis title at the 2022 Hamburg European Open.

Jasmine Paolini and Jil Teichmann were the reigning champions, but did not defend their title.

Seeds

Draw

Draw

References

External links
Main draw

Hamburg European Open - Doubles
Doubles women